Giancarlo Ghironzi (25 February 1932 – 14 March 2020) was a Sammarinese politician, who served twice Captain Regent of San Marino from 1 April 1961 to 1 October 1961, and from 1 October 1969 to 1 April 1970.

Ghironzi was a member of the Sammarinese Christian Democratic Party (PDCS), and from 1959 to 1964 and from 1969 to 1988 he was a member of the Grand and General Council, the Parliament of San Marino. He served as secretary of various departments in multiple governments. He was elected as the Secretary for Finance from 1969 to 1972.

He died on 14 March 2020 after a long illness.

References

1932 births
2020 deaths
Captains Regent of San Marino
Secretaries of State for Finance of San Marino
Members of the Grand and General Council